Burdinale is a river of Belgium, tributary of the Mehaigne. It flows through the province of Liège in the eastern part of the country.

Rivers of Belgium
Rivers of Liège Province